Hercules Mata'afa (born September 18, 1995) is an American football defensive end for the New Jersey Generals of the United States Football League (USFL). He played college football at Washington State University and signed as an undrafted free agent with the Minnesota Vikings in 2018.

College career
As a junior in 2017, Mata'afa was a consensus All-American and was named the Polynesian College Football Player of the Year. He was also named the Pac-12 Defensive Player of the Year by the Associated Press. On December 31, 2017, Mata'afa declared his intentions to enter the 2018 NFL Draft.

Professional career

Minnesota Vikings
Mata'afa signed with the Minnesota Vikings as an undrafted free agent on April 30, 2018. However, on June 6, he suffered a season-ending injury to his ACL. He was waived/injured on June 20, 2018, and was placed on injured reserve after clearing waivers. He was signed back to the Vikings for the 2019 preseason. He managed to make the final roster coming out of training camp. On September 15, 2019, in his NFL debut, he recovered an Aaron Rodgers fumble in a loss to the Packers.

Mata'afa was waived by the Vikings on October 13, 2020, and re-signed to the practice squad two days later. He was elevated to the active roster on October 31 for the team's Week 8 game against the Green Bay Packers, and reverted to the practice squad after the game. He was promoted to the active roster on November 6, 2020.

On August 31, 2021, Mata'afa was waived by the Vikings.

Washington Football Team
The Washington Football Team signed Mata'afa to their practice squad on December 14, 2021. He was released on December 22.

Jacksonville Jaguars
On December 28, 2021, Mata'afa was signed to the Jacksonville Jaguars practice squad, but was released six days later.

New Jersey Generals
Mata'afa signed with the New Jersey Generals of the United States Football League on May 19, 2022.

References

External links
Washington Football Team bio
Washington State Cougars bio

1995 births
Living people
People from Lahaina, Hawaii
Players of American football from Hawaii
American sportspeople of Samoan descent
American football defensive ends
American football defensive tackles
Washington State Cougars football players
All-American college football players
Minnesota Vikings players
Washington Football Team players
Jacksonville Jaguars players
New Jersey Generals (2022) players